The 2014 5-hour Energy 400 Benefiting Special Operations Warrior Foundation was a NASCAR Sprint Cup Series stock car race that was held on May 10, 2014, at Kansas Speedway in Kansas City, Kansas. Contested over 267 laps on the  tri-oval, it was the eleventh race of the 2014 NASCAR Sprint Cup Series. Jeff Gordon won the race, his first win of the season and 89th overall, while Kevin Harvick finished second. Kasey Kahne, Joey Logano, and Dale Earnhardt Jr. rounded out the top five. The top rookies of the race were Kyle Larson (12th), Austin Dillon (19th), and Michael Annett (25th).

This was the first time a Sprint Cup race had been held at night at Kansas Speedway. The previous three spring Kansas races had been held as midday races.

Previous week's race
As the field was coming to the white flag, Alex Bowman got hit from behind by Ryan Newman and turned down into Jimmie Johnson. He then turned head on into the wall just in front of the start/finish line. Also, Justin Allgaier got turned by Cole Whitt and slid through a small section of the infield grass that destroyed the nose of his car. A big piece of it detached from the car and landed in the middle of the track just a few feet from the start/finish line. With the field halfway down the backstretch, the caution was thrown and Denny Hamlin scored the victory in the Aaron's 499 at Talladega Superspeedway. “We really just want to win races regardless of the implications this means for the Chase,” Hamlin said. “It feels good to be back in Victory Lane. I’m just proud of our day today. We’ve come a long way. We couldn’t finish 22nd at the superspeedway races for a long time. It feels good to come to this type of racetrack and know you can win.” "It's frustrating because the simple fact is that we both felt we had the opportunity to pounce," Clint Bowyer said of the finish he’d hoped for teaming up with Greg Biffle to catch the leader. "But NASCAR did the right thing. You can't put people in danger."

Report

Background

The track's turns are banked from seventeen to twenty degrees, while the front stretch, the location of the finish line, is nine to eleven degrees. The back stretch, opposite of the front, is at only five degrees. The racetrack has a seating capacity for more than 72,000 spectators. Matt Kenseth was the defending race winner after winning the event in 2013.

Entry list
The entry list for the 5-hour Energy 400 was released on Monday, May 5, 2014 at 10:23 a.m. Eastern time. Forty-four drivers were entered for the race.

Practice

First practice

Final practice

Qualifying

He also broke the previous track record in round two set last year by Matt Kenseth who started 28th. "Now, we just have to put it all together (Saturday) night when it counts," Harvick said following his record pole run. "It makes life a lot easier when you can have pit stall one. Hopefully, we can have a good night. The weekend has gone well. We had a great test here a few weeks ago and everything has carried right over." "We made the right adjustments and my car was really good through (Turns) one and two in the third round," Joey Logano said of his No. 22 Team Penske Ford. "It's a good starting spot. If you count out the restrictor-plate stuff, we're the only car to make it through every session this season. I'm proud of that and ready to go for another win." "I'm most disappointed in the first run because I thought I had a good lap but obviously didn't push it hard enough," Jeff Gordon said, "...didn't drive it well enough to get us in that first time. And when we had to go back out and put extra laps on the tires and extra heat in the tires, it affected us from that point forward. I'm disappointed that we didn't go faster." Dave Blaney was the only driver who failed to qualify for the race, while his son, Ryan Blaney made his Sprint Cup debut.

Qualifying results

Race

The race was set to start at 7:46 p.m. Eastern time, but the start of the race was delayed due to the weather. The cars started rolling off a few minutes after 8:00 p.m. but then rain started to pick up again. The race finally went green at 8:23 p.m. with Kevin Harvick leading the way.

Harvick surrendered the lead on lap 42 to make his first stop of the night. Joey Logano assumed the position.

Logano hit pit road the next lap and gave the lead to Carl Edwards.

Edwards ducked onto pit road and handed the lead to Jeff Gordon.

Gordon gave up the lead to pit on lap 45 and Brad Keselowski took the top spot.

The first caution of the race flew on lap 47 when Clint Bowyer got loose exiting turn 2, overcorrected and spun out on the backstretch. Because this took place during a cycle of green flag stops, everyone but Keselowski was trapped a lap down. Kevin Harvick got the lucky dog and restarted second. The rest of the cars took the wave-around and got their lap back.

The race restarted on lap 53 and Harvick shot out back to the lead.

The second caution of the race flew on lap 60 for a vicious four car wreck when David Ragan got loose, slid in front of Ryan Truex, turned to the right into Landon Cassill and destroyed the left-front of his car. Michael Annett suffered damage spinning through the infield grass.

The race restarted on lap 67.

The third caution of the race flew on lap 71 when Denny Hamlin got loose exiting turn 2 and spun out.

The race restarted on lap 75.

Kevin Harvick hit pit road on lap 102 and handed the lead to Carl Edwards.

Edwards ducked onto pit road on lap 103 and surrendered the lead to Joey Logano.

The fourth caution of the race flew on lap 110 when Marcos Ambrose got loose and spun out through the grass exiting turn 4. Dale Earnhardt Jr. exited pit road as the leader by taking just two tires. During the caution period, the Musco backstretch lights outside the track turned off for unknown reasons. The lights inside the track were still working. The drivers told race control that the backstretch was illuminated enough to continue racing.

The race restarted on lap 119.

Joey Logano took back the lead on lap 122.

Kasey Kahne took the lead on lap 139.

The fifth caution of the race flew on lap 150 when Jamie McMurray slammed the wall hard in turn 3 following a cut right-front tire.“I’m not 100 percent sure,” said McMurray when asked what caused the accident. “I just entered turn three and I heard a small pop and then just lost all the steering and got into the fence and then knocked the oil lines and everything off which caused the fire. I’m not sure we didn’t really have any tire issues all weekend. Keith (Rodden, crew chief) had been kind of reporting to me what the tires looked like after each stop and hadn’t seen any really wear issues at all. I don’t know if it was just a bad tire or if I ran over something. Just lost all the air and ended up crashing.” Kasey Kahne traded the lead with Joey Logano on pit road with the former stall being behind the start/finish line, but he exited as the leader. The backstretch lights that went out the previous caution period came back on to full power.

The race restarted on lap 161.

Joey Logano returned to the lead on lap 162.

The sixth caution of the race flew with 88 laps to go when Kurt Busch got loose exiting turn 4 and destroyed his splitter sliding through the grass. Jimmie Johnson opted not to pit and took over the lead.

The race restarted with 83 laps to go and Kyle Busch led a lap before Johnson took back the lead.

The seventh caution of the race flew with 81 laps to go for a multi-car wreck on the front stretch that collected six cars. Exiting turn 4, A. J. Allmendinger got loose, hooked Justin Allgaier who went straight into the path of David Gilliland and both slammed the wall hard before the start/finish line. Allmendinger continued through the grass. Casey Mears also slid through the grass trying to avoid the wrecking cars. “I am okay,” said Gilliland after he left the track’s infield care center for examination. “I don’t know what happened. It looked like the 47 (Allmendinger) and 51 (Allgaier) got together and the 51 came back up the track and I hit him and from there a lot of stuff happened. We are alright though. Just a little sore obviously. That is one of the hardest hits I have had in awhile. Hopefully it will be the hardest one for a while to come too. I am find though, just ready to get on with it.” With so much debris on the front stretch and Gilliland's destroyed car needing to be removed, the pace car brought the field down pit road.

The race restarted with 73 laps to go and Joey Logano made his way back to the front.

The eighth caution of the race flew with 65 laps to go when Kurt Busch popped the left-rear tire and spun out exiting turn 2.

The race restarted with 60 laps to go and Kevin Harvick made his way back to the head of the field.

Harvick hit pit road to make his final stop of the race with 30 laps to go and Carl Edwards moved to the lead.

Edwards surrendered the lead to make his last stop with 26 laps to go and Matt Kenseth assumed the lead.

Kenseth ducked onto pit road for the final time with 25 laps to go and Jimmie Johnson assumed the lead.

Johnson dropped onto pit road for the final time with twelve laps to go and Brad Keselowski took over the lead.

Keselowski made his final stop with nine laps to go and the lead cycled back to Jeff Gordon.

Jeff Gordon held off a hard charging Kevin Harvick in the closing laps to score the victory. “I don’t know what it is about this team, this ’24’ car and us here at Kansas on inaugural days, but I love this place,’’ Gordon said. “What an incredible job ... by this race team. They have been giving me the best racecars all year long. I’m going to be 43 this year, but I feel like I’m 25.’’ “What put us in second is I just didn’t get down pit road very good,’’ Harvick said. “I was paying attention to the fuel pressure gauge instead of the pit lights.’’

Race results

Race statistics
 Lead changes: 25 among different drivers
 Cautions/Laps: 8 for 47
 Red flags: 0
 Time of race: 3 hours, 7 minutes and 31 seconds
 Average speed:

Media

Television

Radio

Standings after the race

Drivers' Championship standings

Manufacturers' Championship standings

Note: Only the first sixteen positions are included for the driver standings.

References

5-hour Energy 400
5-hour Energy 400
NASCAR races at Kansas Speedway
5-hour energy 400